Sheroes of Our Time is a Ghanaian women's interest weekly talk show hosted by Anita Erskine on DSTV in English language. Broadcast on Akwaaba Magic channel 150, the show airs every Thursday at 6:00 PM (West Africa Time) and lasts 30 minutes.

Program history 
The pre-recorded 30-minute educative talk show focus on discussions on positive socio-economic advancement issues in Ghana and the African continent at large. Through the introduction of new Ghanaian only content channel on DSTV, as of March 2021 the show began airing on Akwaaba Magic channel 150.
The first season of the show began airing on September 3, 2018, on DSTV channel Fox Life Africa 126, first episode was released on September 3, 2018, and guest was former Ghanaian politician and minister Joyce Aryee.

Host 
 Anita Erskine (2018–present)

List of guests

References

External links 
  Sheroes of Our Time Official Website
  Sheroes of Our Time on Fox Life Africa
  Fox Africa Shows

Television in Ghana
Ghanaian television talk shows
Women and television